Baturovo is a rural locality (a selo) in Kuchuksky Selsoviet, Shelabolikhinsky District, Altai Krai, Russia. The population was 414 as of 2013. There are 8 streets.

Geography 
Baturovo is located 17 km west of Shelabolikha (the district's administrative centre) by road. Kuchuk is the nearest rural locality.

References 

Rural localities in Shelabolikhinsky District